IC 4970 is an unbarred lenticular galaxy of type  in the constellation Pavo. It was discovered on 21 September 1900 by American astronomer DeLisle Stewart.

Interaction with NGC 6872 

IC 4970 is located a few arcseconds away from the much larger barred spiral galaxy NGC 6872, and the two are known to be interacting with each other. Horrelou and Koribalski (2007) reported on a computer simulation used to determine how the two galaxies were interacting. The study concluded that  approached  nearly along the plane of its spiral disk, making a closest approach approximately 130 million years ago resulting in the latter's current highly elongated shape.

An ultraviolet-to-infrared study by Eufrasio, et al. The same appears to have also occurred in the southwestern arm. The bright ultraviolet nature of this cluster indicates that it contains stars less than 200 million years old, which roughly coincides with the timeframe of the collision.

References

External links 
 
 
  at SIMBAD

Unbarred lenticular galaxies
Peculiar galaxies
Interacting galaxies
Pavo (constellation)
073-33
4970
64415
64415
19000921